Sports for Peace was set up during the preliminary stages of the Olympic Games in 2008 to address the question of whether sports or major sporting events can foster common ideals. In "Sports for Peace", athletes from all over the world come together to promote the values of sport, such as fair play, tolerance, the Olympic ideal of freedom, international and intercultural understanding. As a politically independent initiative, "Sports for Peace" offers a neutral basis to foster the spirit of fair play, the sense of community and the elimination of prejudice. The initiative is based in Berlin.

Purpose
Everywhere in the world sport plays an important role in society, for it is capable to convey basic rules and essential values for peaceful coexistence – such as tolerance, team spirit, loyalty and fair play. In addition, sport is especially suitable to form character skills, which are important for a fulfilling and happy life, because the sport environment stimulated the cultivation of discipline, endurance, courage and self-motivation. By conveying the ethics of sport, it also lays the foundations for a more peaceful, human world.

Projects
2008

"Sports for Peace" published in cooperation with Amnesty International and the International Campaign for Tibet an ad in the International Herald Tribune which accompanied the start of the 2008 Beijing Olympic Games. More than 100 sportsmen from all over the world signed an open letter to the Chinese government expressing their desire not only to see a successful sports festival in Beijing, but also to call for respect concerning Olympic ideals and basic human rights.

2009

On the occasion of the 12th IAAF World Championships in Athletics 2009 in Berlin "Sports for Peace" celebrated its official inauguration with legends of sports. The "Sport of Peace" Awards of 2009 were handed over to exemplary persons who met their function as role models in a very special way. The award winner IOC Vice President Sergej Bubka has been investing in the sports association of this home town Donetsk for several years thus lending children a sporting home as well as young sports talents such as Yelena Isinbayeva. In his acceptance speech he stated: ”I feel honoured because this prize represents the full recognition of the work that my colleagues and I have been doing so far". Dr. Edwin Moses, another "Sports for Peace" Award winner and renowned worldwide ambassador for sports ethics and a chairperson of the Laureus World of Sport Academy, responded to his prize: "I am receiving this award in the name of my colleagues at Laureus Sports Foundation. Everywhere in the world we need social involvement and that is why I wholeheartedly welcome the 'Sports for Peace' initiative". The Iranian National Football team received an award for wearing green wristbands in their game against South Korea to express their solidarity with the movement toward freedom and democracy in Iran.

2010

In cooperation with the United Nations "Sports for Peace" staged a gala event on the occasion of the FIFA World Cup in South Africa on 8 June 2010 in Johannesburg at Constitution Hill. This venue is the home of the Constitutional Court and represents the protector of South African basic rights and freedoms. It is the site of the Johannesburg's Old Fort Prison complex, where political leaders like Nelson Mandela but also Mahatma Gandhi were detained.

The gala event became part of the United Nations MDG advocacy campaign, which has the purpose of bringing together a remarkable number of personalities to raise awareness for the urgency to fulfill the UN Millennium Development Goal No. 2: Achieve Universal Primary Education by 2015. Former President of South Africa and Nobel Prize winner Nelson Mandela endorsed and supported the whole initiative. Approximately 400 high-level personalities from sports, economics, culture and media attended the event. The UN also launched the official MDG song performed by 8 African musicians and music groups including the Soweto Gospel Choir.

Part of the advocacy campaign was a week of free public film screenings in townships on peace and development topics and talks/panel discussions by actors and directors in cooperation with the Cinema for Peace Foundation. Films that were screened included “Invictus” with Morgan Freeman, etc.

"Sports for Peace" events were planned for the FIFA Women's World Cup 2011 in Germany and the 2012 Olympic Games in London.

See also
Right To Play

References

External links

Non-profit organisations based in Berlin
Organizations established in 2008
Sports organizations established in 2008
Sports charities